Parliamentary elections were held in Mali on 29 March 2020, with a second round on 19 April. They were initially scheduled to be held on 25 November and 16 December 2018, but were moved to April 2019 and then to June 2019, before being postponed until 2020 by the Council of Ministers. The elections were marred by violence in the north and center of the country.

These are the first elections to fill Mali’s 147-seat parliament since 2013.
 
Thousands of Malians have died as the country suffered sporadic attacks by jihadists as well as cases of inter-ethnic violence since unrest began in 2012.

Electoral system
The 147 members of the National Assembly are elected from 125 constituencies using the two-round system to serve five-year terms. In constituencies where there is more than one seat to be elected, block voting is used.

Conduct
Leader of the opposition Soumaïla Cissé was kidnapped on 26 March, three days prior to the elections. Village chiefs, election officials, and an election observer were kidnapped; there were death threats and a police station was ransacked according to the Coalition for the Observation of Elections in Mali, which had sent 1,600 observers. Nine people were killed when their vehicle hit a landmine on 29 March. Three soldiers were killed and three injured in another landmine on 30 March. An al-Qaeda-aligned group took responsibility for the bombings, as well as an attack on soldiers and the killing of a group of Dozo hunters on 27 March.

Some people were not able to vote on 19 April, and on 30 April the Constitutional Court overturned the results for 31 seats. Keita's Rally for Mali was given ten additional seats in Parliament, making it the largest bloc.

Results
Parties formed different alliances in different constituencies, making it impossible to determine a national set of vote figures. The election continued a decades-long trend of turnout being under 40% in the country, and the first-round elections were marred by violence in the north and center of the country. The Voice of America reported voter turnout of only 12% in Bamako because of concerns about COVID-19, violence, and voter indifference.

Aftermath
Soumaïla Cissé was reappointed Prime Minister on 11 June, and massive protests calling for President Keita's resignation were held on 19 June.

A coup forced the resignation of Keita and Dicko as well as the dissolution of parliament on August 19.

References

Mali
2020 in Mali
April 2020 events in Africa
Elections in Mali
March 2020 events in Africa
Election and referendum articles with incomplete results